The group theatre of Kolkata refers to a tradition in theatres in the Indian city Kolkata, which developed in the 1940s as an alternative to entertainment-oriented theatres. As opposed to commercial theatres, group theatre is "a theatre that is not professional or commercial", characterized by its tendency for experimentation in theme, content and production, and its aim of using the proscenium stage to highlight social messages, rather than having primarily making-money objectives.

Indian People's Theatre Association and Nabanna

The play Nabanna in 1944 is said to be the birth of group theatres in Kolkata. Nabanna was written by  Bijon Bhattacharya, who also co-directed it with Sambhu Mitra. They were both active members of the Indian People's Theatre Association, the association of leftist theatre-artists. In the commercial theatres at that time, entertainment was the sole purpose. However, the time was tumultuous—the Indian independence movement was strengthening on the backdrop of the World War 2, and the plight of Bengal province was further worsened by the  Bengal famine of 1943. Activists and thinkers attempted to use the media of theatre to highlight the plight of the people, and to stage a form of artistic protest.

In this backdrop, the drama Nabanna portrayed a group of peasants as victim of the famine. The peasants had to leave their village due to famine, and they traveled to Kolkata with the hope for survival in the big city. However, they faced a series of crises and eventually got "...reduced to the most abject acknowledge poverty in Kolkata, where they develop a political awareness of their suffering". Another production of the Indian People's Theatre Association  was Jobanbondi.

Notion of group

Prior to the start of group theatre movement, the commercial theatre of Kolkata strived to attract audiences based on star-power. Popular actors such as Sisir Bhaduri, Ahindra Chowdhury and others were considered consistent crowd-pullers. The group theatre tried to depart from this paradigm. Instead of superstars, the emphasis in group theatre was on the group—which was commonly an amalgamation of non-professional participants who identified themselves with the social motives of the movement and participated in the production out of passion for the art. The attempt was to make gononatyo (people's theatre).

Groups after Indian People's Theatre Association 

The Indian People's Theatre Association dispersed in 1947. However, the principal members continued to carry its legacy by forming several groups with similar ideology. Ahindra Chowdhuri, Sombhu Mitra and Tripti Mitra were the leading members of the group Bohurupee. Raktakarabi, Tahar Nam Ti Ranjana, Char Adhyay (written by Rabindranath Tagore) were some of the earlier productions of Bohurupee. Utpal Dutt led another faction of artists and went to create classics like Tiner Talowar and Kallol. In 1950s and 1960s, many critically acclaimed productions were staged, which used international literature including the works of Anton Chekhov, Luigi Pirandello, Henrik Ibsen and Bertolt Brecht. According to one critic, the productions had the "right mix of democratic politics — with certain groups drifting towards a revolutionary rhetoric — and humane ideals, based on literature drawn from the world over".

Notable group theatres include  the Little Theatre Group, Gandharba, Theatre Commune, Amulya Natyagosthi, Calcutta Theatre, Nandikar.
Ghola Kaalmukur

Prominent theatre personalities

Some notable personalities associated with group theatre movement in Kolkata are as follows:
Ajitesh Bandopadhyay: first president of Nandikar
Anirban Bhattacharya: worked in Chetana, Bratyajan. Founded Hatibagan Sangharam
Arpita Ghosh: mainly works in Pancham Vaidik
Arun Mukherjee: founder of Chetana
Badal Sarkar: known for Street Theatre, "Third Theatre", Angaanmanch theatre
Bibhash Chakraborty: founded Anya Theatre
Bratya Basu: founder of Kalindi Bratyajan
Chandan Sen: worked in Indian People's Theatre Association, People's Little Theatre and Chena Mukh
Chinmoy Roy: actor at Nandikar
Chitra Sen: actress in Swapnasandhani
Debasish Dutta: founded Institute of Factual Theatre Arts in 1998
Debesh Chattopadhyay: authored and directed many plays
Debshankar Haldar: worked in Nandikar, Rangapat, Natyaranga, Sudrak, Gandhar, Bratyajon, Sansriti and Blank Verse
Dwijen Bandyopadhyay: worked in many plays
Goutam Halder: worked in Nandikar, Naye Natua and Prachyo
Kaushik Sen: founded Swapnasandhani in 1992
Keya Chakraborty: actress at Nandikar
Kumar Roy: worked in Bohurupee
Manoj Mitra: authored, directed and acted in several plays
Mohit Chattopadhyay: authored many plays
Paran Bandyopadhyay: acted in Indian People's Theatre Association and Shrutee Rangam
Poulomi Basu: daughter of Soumitra Chatterjee. Director and actress. 
Ramaprasad Banik: worked in Bohurupee. Founded Chena Mukh and Theatre Passion
Reshmi Sen: works in Swapnasandhani
Riddhi Sen: works in Swapnasandhani
Rudraprasad Sengupta: associated with the group Nandikar
Saumya Majumder: founded Sandarbha in 1977
Shaoli Mitra: worked in Bohurupee
Sombhu Mitra: founder of Bohurupee, director
Soumitra Chatterjee: authored, directed and acted in several plays
Swatilekha Sengupta: actress of Nandikar
Sohini Sengupta: actress and director at Nandikar
Suman Mukhopadhyay: director at Chetana
Sujan Mukhopadhyay: actor and director at Chetana
Surangana Bandyopadhyay: works in Swapnasandhani
Tripti Mitra: wife of Sombhu Mitra, Sangeet Natak Akademi Award winner was mainly a worker of Bohurupee
Usha Ganguly, founded Rangakarmee theatre group in 1976
Utpal Dutt: authored, directed and acted in several plays

Arun Kumar Sarkar: founded Green Amateur Group in 1961
Arindam Saha, founded Natyachetana'03 (Theatre for mass education) in 2002
Srideep Chatterjee: founded AKTO in August 2013
Nilkantha Sengupta: founded Theatre Commune
Biswarup Chattopadhyay: founded Dum Dum Biswarupam in 2013
[Chandra Gupta: founded Aghraner Nabanna in 1999
Deep-Gunjan (Dipankar Bose & Gunjan Ganguly): founded Ghola Kaalmukur in 2012
Pinki Ghosh Dastidar: founded Sampan in 2011
Sumit Dasgupta & Jagdeep Das: founded Ballygunge Aarushi in 2012
Avishek DebRoy, Ahitagni, Rajib Banerjee: founded Drishti Ekhon in 2013
Sanjay Chakraborty: founded Ultadanga Dashkatha in 2011

References

Bengali theatre
Theatre in Kolkata
History of theatre